Service with the Colors is a 1940 American short drama film directed by B. Reeves Eason. It was nominated for an Academy Award at the 13th Academy Awards for Best Short Subject (Two-Reel).

Cast
 Robert Armstrong as Sgt. Clicker
 William Lundigan as Thomas Stanton
 Henry O'Neill as Col. Nelson
 William T. Orr as Charles Corbin (as William Orr)
 Herbert Anderson as Hiram Briggs
 George Haywood as James Taylor

References

External links
 

1940 films
1940 drama films
1940 short films
American drama short films
Films directed by B. Reeves Eason
1940s English-language films
1940s American films